The Nokia Lumia 530 is an entry-level smartphone developed by Microsoft Mobile that runs the Windows Phone 8.1 operating system.

On November 10, 2014, Microsoft released its successor, the Microsoft Lumia 535, with a 1-inch larger IPS display, double tap to wake, ambient light sensor, Corning Gorilla Glass 3, 8 GB of internal memory (vs 4 GB), 1GB of RAM (vs 512 MB), larger 1905 mAh battery (vs. 1430mAh), 5 MP front-facing camera (vs. no FF camera), auto-focus for the rear camera (vs fixed focus), and LED Flash (vs. no flash).

Hardware
The Lumia 530 comes in a slate form factor with 4-inch touchscreen. The viewing angles are slightly reduced compared to other phones in the Lumia line.

Software
The Lumia 530 ships with Microsoft Windows Phone 8.1, as well as exclusive software like Nokia Mix Radio and HERE Maps (featuring turn-by-turn directions, offline maps and navigation, and transit info).

Reception

Ars Technica considers the Lumia 530 a step in the wrong direction. In comparison to its predecessor, the Lumia 520, the Lumia 530 is worse as it removes the dedicated camera button, has a worse display with poor contrast, color, and viewing angles, and it’s susceptible to backlight bleed and has a worse GPU. The limited amount of RAM makes some games not able to run and cripples the multitasking ability making apps switching slow.

PC Advisor also considers the Lumia 530 to be worse than its predecessor, as it has a worse camera with fixed focus, instead of the auto-focus of the predecessor, half the storage size, and a worse graphics processor.

Variants
There are two dual sim variants: RM-1019 and RM-1020

See also

Microsoft Lumia
 Nokia Lumia 520
 Nokia Lumia 525
 Nokia X, X+, XL

References 

Lumia 530
Microsoft Lumia
Windows Phone devices
Mobile phones introduced in 2014
Discontinued smartphones
Nokia Lumia 530
Mobile phones with user-replaceable battery